This is a list of the bird species recorded in Belgium. The avifauna of Belgium include a total of 477 species, of which 8 have been introduced by humans.

This list's taxonomic treatment (designation and sequence of orders, families and species) and nomenclature (common and scientific names) follows the conventions of The Clements Checklist of Birds of the World, 2022 edition. The family accounts at the beginning of each heading reflect this taxonomy, as do the species counts found in each family account. Species accounts follow the Belgian Rare Birds Committee. Introduced and accidental species are included in the total counts for Belgium.

The following tags have been used to highlight several categories. The commonly occurring native species do not fall into any of these categories.

 (A) Accidental - a species that rarely or accidentally occurs in Belgium
 (I) Introduced - a species introduced to Belgium as a consequence, direct or indirect, of human actions
 (Ex) Extirpated - a species that no longer occurs in Belgium although populations exist elsewhere

Ducks, geese, and waterfowl

Order: AnseriformesFamily: Anatidae

Anatidae includes the ducks and most duck-like waterfowl, such as geese and swans. These birds are adapted to an aquatic existence with webbed feet, flattened bills, and feathers that are excellent at shedding water due to an oily coating.

 Bar-headed goose, Anser indicus (A)
 Snow goose, Anser caerulescens
 Graylag goose, Anser anser
 Greater white-fronted goose, Anser albifrons
 Lesser white-fronted goose, Anser erythropus (A)
 Taiga bean-goose, Anser fabalis(A)
 Tundra bean-goose, Anser serrirostris
 Pink-footed goose, Anser brachyrhynchus
 Brant, Branta bernicla
 Barnacle goose, Branta leucopsis
 Canada goose, Branta canadensis (I)
 Red-breasted goose, Branta ruficollis (A)
 Mute swan, Cygnus olor
 Tundra swan, Cygnus columbianus
 Whooper swan, Cygnus cygnus
 Egyptian goose, Alopochen aegyptiacus (I)
 Ruddy shelduck, Tadorna ferruginea (A)
 Common shelduck, Tadorna tadorna
 Mandarin duck, Aix galericulata (I)
 Baikal teal, Sibirionetta formosa (A)
 Garganey, Spatula querquedula
 Blue-winged teal, Spatula discors (A)
 Northern shoveler, Spatula clypeata
 Gadwall, Mareca strepera
 Falcated duck, Mareca falcata (A)
 Eurasian wigeon, Mareca penelope
 American wigeon, Mareca americana (A)
 Mallard, Anas platyrhynchos
 Northern pintail, Anas acuta
 Green-winged teal, Anas crecca
 Red-crested pochard, Netta rufina
 Common pochard, Aythya ferina
 Ring-necked duck, Aythya collaris (A)
 Ferruginous duck, Aythya nyroca (A)
 Tufted duck, Aythya fuligula
 Greater scaup, Aythya marila
 Lesser scaup, Aythya affinis (A)
 King eider, Somateria spectabilis (A)
 Common eider, Somateria mollissima
 Surf scoter, Melanitta perspicillata (A)
 Velvet scoter, Melanitta fusca
 Common scoter, Melanitta nigra
 Long-tailed duck, Clangula hyemalis (A)
 Common goldeneye, Bucephala clangula
 Smew, Mergellus albellus
 Common merganser, Mergus merganser
 Red-breasted merganser, Mergus serrator
 Ruddy duck, Oxyura jamaicensis (I)
 White-headed duck, Oxyura leucocephala (A)

Pheasants, grouse, and allies
Order: GalliformesFamily: Phasianidae

The Phasianidae are a family of terrestrial birds. In general, they are plump (although they vary in size) and have broad, relatively short wings.

Grebes
Order: PodicipediformesFamily: Podicipedidae

Grebes are small to medium-large freshwater diving birds. They have lobed toes and are excellent swimmers and divers. However, they have their feet placed far back on the body, making them quite ungainly on land.

Pigeons and doves
Order: ColumbiformesFamily: Columbidae

Pigeons and doves are stout-bodied birds with short necks and short slender bills with a fleshy cere.

 Rock pigeon, Columba livia (I)
 Stock dove, Columba oenas
 Common wood-pigeon, Columba palumbus
 European turtle-dove, Streptopelia turtur
 Oriental turtle-dove, Streptopelia orientalis (A)
 Eurasian collared-dove, Streptopelia decaocto

Sandgrouse
Order: PterocliformesFamily: Pteroclidae

Sandgrouse have small, pigeon like heads and necks, but sturdy compact bodies. They have long pointed wings and sometimes tails and a fast direct flight. Flocks fly to watering holes at dawn and dusk. Their legs are feathered down to the toes.

 Pallas's sandgrouse, Syrrhaptes paradoxus (A)
 Black-bellied sandgrouse, Pterocles orientalis (A)

Bustards
Order: OtidiformesFamily: Otididae

Bustards are large terrestrial birds mainly associated with dry open country and steppes in the Old World. They are omnivorous and nest on the ground. They walk steadily on strong legs and big toes, pecking for food as they go. They have long broad wings with "fingered" wingtips and striking patterns in flight. Many have interesting mating displays.

Cuckoos
Order: CuculiformesFamily: Cuculidae

The family Cuculidae includes cuckoos, roadrunners and anis. These birds are of variable size with slender bodies, long tails and strong legs. The Old World cuckoos are brood parasites.

 Great spotted cuckoo, Clamator glandarius (A)
 Yellow-billed cuckoo, Coccyzus americanus (A)
 Common cuckoo, Cuculus canorus

Nightjars
Order: CaprimulgiformesFamily: Caprimulgidae

Nightjars are medium-sized nocturnal birds that usually nest on the ground. They have long wings, short legs and very short bills. Most have small feet, of little use for walking, and long pointed wings. Their soft plumage is camouflaged to resemble bark or leaves.

 Eurasian nightjar, Caprimulgus europaeus

Swifts
Order: CaprimulgiformesFamily: Apodidae

Swifts are small birds which spend the majority of their lives flying. These birds have very short legs and never settle voluntarily on the ground, perching instead only on vertical surfaces. Many swifts have long swept-back wings which resemble a crescent or boomerang.

 Alpine swift, Tachymarptis melba (A)
 Common swift, Apus apus
 Pallid swift, Apus pallidus (A)
 Little swift, Apus affinis (A)

Rails, gallinules and coots
Order: GruiformesFamily: Rallidae

Rallidae is a large family of small to medium-sized birds which includes the rails, crakes, coots and gallinules. Typically they inhabit dense vegetation in damp environments near lakes, swamps or rivers. In general they are shy and secretive birds, making them difficult to observe. Most species have strong legs and long toes which are well adapted to soft uneven surfaces. They tend to have short, rounded wings and to be weak fliers.

Cranes
Order: GruiformesFamily: Gruidae

Cranes are large, long-legged and long-necked birds. Unlike the similar-looking but unrelated herons, cranes fly with necks outstretched, not pulled back. Most have elaborate and noisy courting displays or "dances".

Thick-knees
Order: CharadriiformesFamily: Burhinidae

The thick-knees are a group of largely tropical waders in the family Burhinidae. They are found worldwide within the tropical zone, with some species also breeding in temperate Europe and Australia. They are medium to large waders with strong black or yellow-black bills, large yellow eyes and cryptic plumage. Despite being classed as waders, most species have a preference for arid or semi-arid habitats.

 Eurasian thick-knee, Burhinus oedicnemus (A)

Stilts and avocets
Order: CharadriiformesFamily: Recurvirostridae

Recurvirostridae is a family of large wading birds, which includes the avocets and stilts. The avocets have long legs and long up-curved bills. The stilts have extremely long legs and long, thin, straight bills.

Oystercatchers
Order: CharadriiformesFamily: Haematopodidae

The oystercatchers are large and noisy plover-like birds, with strong bills used for smashing or prising open molluscs.

Plovers and lapwings

Order: CharadriiformesFamily: Charadriidae

The family Charadriidae includes the plovers, dotterels and lapwings. They are small to medium-sized birds with compact bodies, short, thick necks and long, usually pointed, wings. They are found in open country worldwide, mostly in habitats near water.

 Black-bellied plover, Pluvialis squatarola
 European golden-plover, Pluvialis apricaria
 American golden-plover, Pluvialis dominica (A)
 Northern lapwing, Vanellus vanellus
 Sociable lapwing, Vanellus gregarius (A)
 White-tailed lapwing, Vanellus leucurus (A)
 Lesser sand-plover, Charadrius mongolus (A)
 Greater sand-plover, Charadrius leschenaultii (A)
 Kentish plover, Charadrius alexandrinus
 Common ringed plover, Charadrius hiaticula
 Little ringed plover, Charadrius dubius
 Eurasian dotterel, Charadrius morinellus

Sandpipers and allies
Order: CharadriiformesFamily: Scolopacidae

Scolopacidae is a large diverse family of small to medium-sized shorebirds including the sandpipers, curlews, godwits, shanks, tattlers, woodcocks, snipes, dowitchers and phalaropes. The majority of these species eat small invertebrates picked out of the mud or soil. Variation in length of legs and bills enables multiple species to feed in the same habitat, particularly on the coast, without direct competition for food.

 Upland sandpiper, Bartramia longicauda (A)
 Whimbrel, Numenius phaeopus
 Little curlew, Numenius minutus (A)
 Slender-billed curlew, Numenius tenuirostris (A)
 Eurasian curlew, Numenius arquata
 Bar-tailed godwit, Limosa lapponica
 Black-tailed godwit, Limosa limosa
 Ruddy turnstone, Arenaria interpres
 Red knot, Calidris canutus
 Ruff, Calidris pugnax
 Broad-billed sandpiper, Calidris falcinellus (A)
 Sharp-tailed sandpiper, Calidris acuminata (A)
 Curlew sandpiper, Calidris ferruginea
 Temminck's stint, Calidris temminckii
 Red-necked stint, Calidris ruficollis (A)
 Sanderling, Calidris alba
 Dunlin, Calidris alpina
 Purple sandpiper, Calidris maritima
 Baird's sandpiper, Calidris bairdii (A)
 Little stint, Calidris minuta
 Least sandpiper, Calidris minutilla (A)
 White-rumped sandpiper, Calidris fuscicollis (A)
 Buff-breasted sandpiper, Calidris subruficollis (A)
 Pectoral sandpiper, Calidris melanotos (A)
 Long-billed dowitcher, Limnodromus scolopaceus (A)
 Jack snipe, Lymnocryptes minimus
 Eurasian woodcock, Scolopax rusticola
 Great snipe, Gallinago media (A)
 Common snipe, Gallinago gallinago
 Terek sandpiper, Xenus cinereus (A)
 Wilson's phalarope, Phalaropus tricolor (A)
 Red-necked phalarope, Phalaropus lobatus (A)
 Red phalarope, Phalaropus fulicarius (A)
 Common sandpiper, Actitis hypoleucos
 Spotted sandpiper, Actitis macularia (A)
 Green sandpiper, Tringa ochropus
 Spotted redshank, Tringa erythropus
 Greater yellowlegs, Tringa melanoleuca (A)
 Common greenshank, Tringa nebularia
 Lesser yellowlegs, Tringa flavipes (A)
 Marsh sandpiper, Tringa stagnatilis (A)
 Wood sandpiper, Tringa glareola
 Common redshank, Tringa totanus

Pratincoles and coursers
Order: CharadriiformesFamily: Glareolidae

Glareolidae is a family of wading birds comprising the pratincoles, which have short legs, long pointed wings and long forked tails, and the coursers, which have long legs, short wings and long, pointed bills which curve downwards.

 Cream-colored courser, Cursorius cursor (A)
 Collared pratincole, Glareola pratincola (A)
 Black-winged pratincole, Glareola nordmanni (A)

Skuas and jaegers
Order: CharadriiformesFamily: Stercorariidae

The family Stercorariidae are, in general, medium to large birds, typically with grey or brown plumage, often with white markings on the wings. They nest on the ground in temperate and arctic regions and are long-distance migrants.

 Great skua, Stercorarius skua
 Pomarine jaeger, Stercorarius pomarinus
 Parasitic jaeger, Stercorarius parasiticus
 Long-tailed jaeger, Stercorarius longicaudus

Auks, murres and puffins
Order: CharadriiformesFamily: Alcidae

Alcids are superficially similar to penguins due to their black-and-white colours, their upright posture and some of their habits, however they are not related to the penguins and differ in being able to fly. Auks live on the open sea, only deliberately coming ashore to nest.

 Dovekie, Alle alle (A)
 Common murre, Uria aalge
 Thick-billed murre, Uria lomvia (A)
 Razorbill, Alca torda
 Black guillemot, Cepphus grylle (A)
 Atlantic puffin, Fratercula arctica (A)

Gulls, terns, and skimmers
Order: CharadriiformesFamily: Laridae

Laridae is a family of medium to large seabirds, the gulls, terns, and skimmers. Gulls are typically grey or white, often with black markings on the head or wings. They have stout, longish bills and webbed feet. Terns are a group of generally medium to large seabirds typically with grey or white plumage, often with black markings on the head. Most terns hunt fish by diving but some pick insects off the surface of fresh water. Terns are generally long-lived birds, with several species known to live in excess of 30 years.

 Black-legged kittiwake, Rissa tridactyla
 Sabine's gull, Xema sabini (A)
 Slender-billed gull, Chroicocephalus genei (A)
 Bonaparte's gull, Chroicocephalus philadelphia (A)
 Black-headed gull, Chroicocephalus ridibundus
 Little gull, Hydrocoloeus minutus
 Ross's gull, Rhodostethia rosea (A)
 Laughing gull, Leucophaeus atricilla (A)
 Franklin's gull, Leucophaeus pipixcan (A)
 Mediterranean gull, Ichthyaetus melanocephalus
 Pallas's gull, Ichthyaetus ichthyaetus (A)
 Audouin's gull, Ichthyaetus audouini (A)
 Common gull, Larus canus
 Ring-billed gull, Larus delawarensis (A)
 Herring gull, Larus argentatus
 Yellow-legged gull, Larus michahellis
 Caspian gull, Larus cachinnans
 Iceland gull, Larus glaucoides (A)
 Lesser black-backed gull, Larus fuscus
 Glaucous gull, Larus hyperboreus (A)
 Great black-backed gull, Larus marinus
 Bridled tern, Onychoprion anaethetus (A)
 Little tern, Sternula albifrons
 Gull-billed tern, Gelochelidon nilotica (A)
 Caspian tern, Hydroprogne caspia (A)
 Black tern, Chlidonias niger
 White-winged tern, Chlidonias leucopterus (A)
 Whiskered tern, Chlidonias hybrida (A)
 Roseate tern, Sterna dougallii (A)
 Common tern, Sterna hirundo
 Arctic tern, Sterna paradisaea
 Forster's tern, Sterna forsteri (A)
 Sandwich tern, Thalasseus sandvicensis
 Elegant tern, Thalasseus elegans (A)

Loons
Order: GaviiformesFamily: Gaviidae

Loons, known as divers in Europe, are a group of aquatic birds found in many parts of North America and northern Europe. They are the size of a large duck or small goose, which they somewhat resemble when swimming, but to which they are completely unrelated.

Albatrosses
Order: ProcellariiformesFamily: Diomedeidae

Albatrosses, of the biological family Diomedeidae, are large seabirds related to the procellariids, storm petrels, and diving petrels in the order Procellariiformes (the tubenoses). They range widely in the Southern Ocean and the North Pacific.

Northern storm-petrels
Order: ProcellariiformesFamily: Hydrobatidae

The northern storm-petrels are relatives of the petrels and are the smallest seabirds. They feed on planktonic crustaceans and small fish picked from the surface, typically while hovering. The flight is fluttering and sometimes bat-like.

Shearwaters and petrels
Order: ProcellariiformesFamily: Procellariidae

The procellariids are the main group of medium-sized "true petrels", characterised by united nostrils with medium septum and a long outer functional primary.

Storks
Order: CiconiiformesFamily: Ciconiidae

Storks are large, long-legged, long-necked, wading birds with long, stout bills. Storks are mute, but bill-clattering is an important mode of communication at the nest. Their nests can be large and may be reused for many years. Many species are migratory.

Boobies and gannets
Order: SuliformesFamily: Sulidae

The sulids comprise the gannets and boobies. Both groups are medium to large coastal seabirds that plunge-dive for fish.

Cormorants and shags
Order: SuliformesFamily: Phalacrocoracidae

Phalacrocoracidae is a family of medium to large coastal, fish-eating seabirds that includes cormorants and shags. Plumage colouration varies, with the majority having mainly dark plumage, some species being black-and-white and a few being colourful.

Herons, egrets, and bitterns
Order: PelecaniformesFamily: Ardeidae

The family Ardeidae contains the bitterns, herons and egrets. Herons and egrets are medium to large wading birds with long necks and legs. Bitterns tend to be shorter necked and more wary. Members of Ardeidae fly with their necks retracted, unlike other long-necked birds such as storks, ibises and spoonbills.

Ibises and spoonbills
Order: PelecaniformesFamily: Threskiornithidae

Threskiornithidae is a family of large terrestrial and wading birds which includes the ibises and spoonbills. They have long, broad wings with 11 primary and about 20 secondary feathers. They are strong fliers and despite their size and weight, very capable soarers.

Osprey
Order: AccipitriformesFamily: Pandionidae

The family Pandionidae contains only one species, the osprey. The osprey is a medium-large raptor which is a specialist fish-eater with a worldwide distribution.

Hawks, eagles, and kites
Order: AccipitriformesFamily: Accipitridae

Accipitridae is a family of birds of prey, which includes hawks, eagles, kites, harriers and Old World vultures. These birds have powerful hooked beaks for tearing flesh from their prey, strong legs, powerful talons and keen eyesight.

 Black-winged kite, Elanus caeruleus (A)
 Egyptian vulture, Neophron percnopterus (A)
 European honey-buzzard, Pernis apivorus
 Cinereous vulture, Aegypius monachus (A)
 Eurasian griffon, Gyps fulvus (A)
 Short-toed snake-eagle, Circaetus gallicus (A)
 Lesser spotted eagle, Clanga pomarina (A)
 Greater spotted eagle, Clanga clanga (A)
 Booted eagle, Hieraaetus pennatus (A)
 Steppe eagle, Aquila nipalensis (A)
 Golden eagle, Aquila chrysaetos (A)
 Bonelli's eagle, Aquila fasciata (A)
 Eurasian marsh-harrier, Circus aeruginosus
 Hen harrier, Circus cyaneus
 Pallid harrier, Circus macrourus (A)
 Montagu's harrier, Circus pygargus
 Eurasian sparrowhawk, Accipiter nisus
 Northern goshawk, Accipiter gentilis
 Red kite, Milvus milvus
 Black kite, Milvus migrans
 White-tailed eagle, Haliaeetus albicilla (A)
 Rough-legged hawk, Buteo lagopus (A)
 Common buzzard, Buteo buteo
 Long-legged buzzard, Buteo rufinus (A)

Barn-owls
Order: StrigiformesFamily: Tytonidae

Barn-owls are medium to large owls with large heads and characteristic heart-shaped faces. They have long strong legs with powerful talons.

 Barn owl, Tyto alba

Owls
Order: StrigiformesFamily: Strigidae

The typical owls are small to large solitary nocturnal birds of prey. They have large forward-facing eyes and ears, a hawk-like beak and a conspicuous circle of feathers around each eye called a facial disk.

 Eurasian scops-owl, Otus scops (A)
 Eurasian eagle-owl, Bubo bubo
 Snowy owl, Bubo scandiacus (A)
 Tawny owl, Strix aluco
 Northern hawk owl, Surnia ulula (A)
 Eurasian pygmy-owl, Glaucidium passerinum (A)
 Little owl, Athene noctua
 Long-eared owl, Asio otus
 Short-eared owl, Asio flammeus
 Boreal owl, Aegolius funereus

Hoopoes
Order: BucerotiformesFamily: Upupidae

Hoopoes have black, white and orangey-pink colouring with a large erectile crest on their head.

 Eurasian hoopoe, Upupa epops

Kingfishers
Order: CoraciiformesFamily: Alcedinidae

Kingfishers are medium-sized birds with large heads, long, pointed bills, short legs and stubby tails.

 Common kingfisher, Alcedo atthis

Bee-eaters
Order: CoraciiformesFamily: Meropidae

The bee-eaters are a group of near passerine birds in the family Meropidae. Most species are found in Africa but others occur in southern Europe, Madagascar, Australia and New Guinea. They are characterised by richly coloured plumage, slender bodies and usually elongated central tail feathers. All are colourful and have long downturned bills and pointed wings, which give them a swallow-like appearance when seen from afar.

 Blue-cheeked bee-eater, Merops persicus (A)
 European bee-eater, Merops apiaster

Rollers
Order: CoraciiformesFamily: Coraciidae

Rollers resemble crows in size and build, but are more closely related to the kingfishers and bee-eaters. They share the colourful appearance of those groups with blues and browns predominating. The two inner front toes are connected, but the outer toe is not.

 European roller, Coracias garrulus (A)

Woodpeckers
Order: PiciformesFamily: Picidae

Woodpeckers are small to medium-sized birds with chisel-like beaks, short legs, stiff tails and long tongues used for capturing insects. Some species have feet with two toes pointing forward and two backward, while several species have only three toes. Many woodpeckers have the habit of tapping noisily on tree trunks with their beaks.

 Eurasian wryneck, Jynx torquilla
 Middle spotted woodpecker, Dendrocoptes medius
 White-backed woodpecker, Dendrocopos leucotos (A)
 Great spotted woodpecker, Dendrocopos major
 Lesser spotted woodpecker, Dryobates minor
 Gray-headed woodpecker, Picus canus
 Eurasian green woodpecker, Picus viridis
 Black woodpecker, Dryocopus martius

Falcons and caracaras
Order: FalconiformesFamily: Falconidae

Falconidae is a family of diurnal birds of prey. They differ from hawks, eagles and kites in that they kill with their beaks instead of their talons. T

 Lesser kestrel, Falco naumanni (A)
 Eurasian kestrel, Falco tinnunculus
 Red-footed falcon, Falco vespertinus (A)
 Merlin, Falco columbarius
 Eurasian hobby, Falco subbuteo
 Gyrfalcon, Falco rusticolus (A)
 Peregrine falcon, Falco peregrinus

Old World parrots
Order: PsittaciformesFamily: Psittaculidae

Characteristic features of parrots include a strong curved bill, an upright stance, strong legs, and clawed zygodactyl feet. Many parrots are vividly coloured, and some are multi-coloured. Old World parrots are found from Africa east across south and southeast Asia and Oceania to Australia and New Zealand.

 Rose-ringed parakeet, Psittacula krameri (I)

New World and African parrots
Order: PsittaciformesFamily: Psittacidae

New World and African parrots are small to large birds with a characteristic curved beak. Their upper mandibles have slight mobility in the joint with the skull and they have a generally erect stance. All parrots are zygodactyl, having the four toes on each foot placed two at the front and two to the back.

 Monk parakeet, Myiopsitta monachus (I)

Vireos, shrike-babblers, and erpornis
Order: PasseriformesFamily: Vireonidae

The vireos are a group of small to medium-sized passerine birds restricted to the New World. They are typically greenish in colour and resemble wood warblers apart from their heavier bills.

 Red-eyed vireo, Vireo olivaceus (A)

Old World orioles
Order: PasseriformesFamily: Oriolidae

The Old World orioles are colourful passerine birds. They are not related to the New World orioles.

 Eurasian golden oriole, Oriolus oriolus

Shrikes
Order: PasseriformesFamily: Laniidae

Shrikes are passerine birds known for their habit of catching other birds and small animals and impaling the uneaten portions of their bodies on thorns. A typical shrike's beak is hooked, like a bird of prey.

 Red-backed shrike, Lanius collurio
 Isabelline shrike, Lanius isabellinus (A)
 Brown shrike, Lanius cristatus (A)
 Long-tailed shrike, Lanius schach (A)
 Great gray shrike, Lanius excubitor
 Lesser gray shrike, Lanius minor (A)
 Woodchat shrike, Lanius senator (A)

Crows, jays, and magpies
Order: PasseriformesFamily: Corvidae

The family Corvidae includes crows, ravens, jays, choughs, magpies, treepies, nutcrackers, and ground jays. Corvids are above average in size among the Passeriformes, and some of the larger species show high levels of intelligence.

 Eurasian jay, Garrulus glandarius
 Eurasian magpie, Pica pica
 Eurasian nutcracker, Nucifraga caryocatactes
 Eurasian jackdaw, Corvus monedula
 Rook, Corvus frugilegus
 Carrion crow, Corvus corone
 Hooded crow, Corvus cornix
 Common raven, Corvus corax

Tits, chickadees, and titmice
Order: PasseriformesFamily: Paridae

The Paridae are mainly small stocky woodland species with short stout bills. Some have crests. They are adaptable birds, with a mixed diet including seeds and insects.

 Coal tit, Periparus ater
 Crested tit, Lophophanes cristatus
 Marsh tit, Poecile palustris
 Willow tit, Poecile montana
 Eurasian blue tit, Cyanistes caeruleus
 Great tit, Parus major

Penduline-tits
Order: PasseriformesFamily: Remizidae

The penduline tits are a group of small passerine birds related to the true tits. They are insectivores.

 Eurasian penduline-tit, Remiz pendulinus

Larks
Order: PasseriformesFamily: Alaudidae

Larks are small terrestrial birds with often extravagant songs and display flights. Most larks are fairly dull in appearance. Their food is insects and seeds. T

 Horned lark, Eremophila alpestris
 Greater short-toed lark, Calandrella brachydactyla (A)
 Calandra lark, Melanocorypha calandra (A)
 Mediterranean short-toed lark, 	Alaudala rufescens (A)
 Turkestan short-toed lark, Alaudala heinei (A)
 Wood lark, Lullula arborea
 Eurasian skylark, Alauda arvensis
 Crested lark, Galerida cristata

Bearded reedling
Order: PasseriformesFamily: Panuridae

This species, the only one in its family, is found in reed beds throughout temperate Europe and Asia.

 Bearded reedling, Panurus biarmicus

Cisticolas and allies
Order: PasseriformesFamily: Cisticolidae

The Cisticolidae are warblers found mainly in warmer southern regions of the Old World. They are generally very small birds of drab brown or grey appearance found in open country such as grassland or scrub.

 Zitting cisticola, Cisticola juncidis (A)

Reed warblers and allies
Order: PasseriformesFamily: Acrocephalidae

The members of this family are usually rather large for "warblers". Most are rather plain olivaceous brown above with much yellow to beige below. They are usually found in open woodland, reedbeds, or tall grass. The family occurs mostly in southern to western Eurasia and surroundings, but it also ranges far into the Pacific, with some species in Africa.

 Booted warbler, Iduna caligata (A)
 Sykes's warbler, Iduna rama (A)
 Eastern olivaceous warbler, Iduna pallida (A)
 Melodious warbler, Hippolais polyglotta
 Icterine warbler, Hippolais icterina
 Aquatic warbler, Acrocephalus paludicola (A)
 Moustached warbler, Acrocephalus melanopogon (A)
 Sedge warbler, Acrocephalus schoenobaenus
 Paddyfield warbler, Acrocephalus agricola (A)
 Blyth's reed warbler, Acrocephalus dumetorum (A)
 Marsh warbler, Acrocephalus palustris
 Eurasian reed warbler, Acrocephalus scirpaceus
 Great reed warbler, Acrocephalus arundinaceus

Grassbirds and allies
Order: PasseriformesFamily: Locustellidae

Locustellidae are a family of small insectivorous songbirds found mainly in Eurasia, Africa, and the Australian region. They are smallish birds with tails that are usually long and pointed, and tend to be drab brownish or buffy all over.

 Pallas's grasshopper warbler, Helopsaltes certhiola (A)
 Lanceolated warbler, Locustella lanceolata (A)
 River warbler, Locustella fluviatilis (A)
 Savi's warbler, Locustella luscinioides
 Common grasshopper-warbler, Locustella naevia

Swallows
Order: PasseriformesFamily: Hirundinidae

The family Hirundinidae is adapted to aerial feeding. They have a slender streamlined body, long pointed wings and a short bill with a wide gape. The feet are adapted to perching rather than walking, and the front toes are partially joined at the base.

 Bank swallow, Riparia riparia
 Eurasian crag-martin, Ptyonoprogne rupestris (A)
 Barn swallow, Hirundo rustica
 Red-rumped swallow, Cecropis daurica (A)
 Common house-martin, Delichon urbica

Leaf warblers
Order: PasseriformesFamily: Phylloscopidae

Leaf warblers are a family of small insectivorous birds found mostly in Eurasia and ranging into Wallacea and Africa. The species are of various sizes, often green-plumaged above and yellow below, or more subdued with grayish-green to grayish-brown colors.

 Wood warbler, Phylloscopus sibilatrix
 Western Bonelli's warbler, Phylloscopus bonelli (A)
 Yellow-browed warbler, Phylloscopus inornatus
 Hume's warbler, Phylloscopus humei (A)
 Pallas's leaf warbler, Phylloscopus proregulus (A)
 Radde's warbler, Phylloscopus schwarzi (A)
 Dusky warbler, Phylloscopus fuscatus (A)
 Willow warbler, Phylloscopus trochilus
 Common chiffchaff, Phylloscopus collybita
 Iberian chiffchaff, Phylloscopus ibericus (A)
 Eastern crowned warbler, Phylloscopus coronatus (A)
 Greenish warbler, Phylloscopus trochiloides (A)
 Arctic warbler, Phylloscopus borealis (A)

Bush warblers and allies
Order: PasseriformesFamily: Scotocercidae

The members of this family are found throughout Africa, Asia, and Polynesia. Their taxonomy is in flux, and some authorities place some genera in other families.

 Cetti's warbler, Cettia cetti

Long-tailed tits
Order: PasseriformesFamily: Aegithalidae

Long-tailed tits are a group of small passerine birds with medium to long tails. They make woven bag nests in trees. Most eat a mixed diet which includes insects.

 Long-tailed tit, Aegithalos caudatus

Sylviid warblers, parrotbills, and allies
Order: PasseriformesFamily: Sylviidae

The family Sylviidae is a group of small insectivorous passerine birds. They mainly occur as breeding species, as the common name implies, in Europe, Asia and, to a lesser extent, Africa. Most are of generally undistinguished appearance, but many have distinctive songs.

 Eurasian blackcap, Sylvia atricapilla
 Garden warbler, Sylvia borin
 Barred warbler, Curruca nisoria (A)
 Lesser whitethroat, Curruca curruca
 Western Orphean warbler, Curruca hortensis (A)
 Western subalpine warbler, Curruca iberiae (A)
 Eastern subalpine warbler, Curruca cantillans (A)
 Moltoni's warbler, Curruca subalpina (A)
 Sardinian warbler, Curruca melanocephala (A)
 Greater whitethroat, Curruca communis
 Spectacled warbler, Curruca conspicillata (A)
 Marmora's warbler, Curruca sarda (A)
 Dartford warbler, Curruca undata (A)

Kinglets
Order: PasseriformesFamily: Regulidae

The kinglets, also called crests, are a small group of birds often included in the Old World warblers, but frequently given family status because they also resemble the titmice.

 Goldcrest, Regulus regulus
 Common firecrest, Regulus ignicapillus

Wallcreeper
Order: PasseriformesFamily: Tichodromidae

The wallcreeper is a small bird related to the nuthatch family, which has stunning crimson, grey and black plumage.

 Wallcreeper, Tichodroma muraria (A)

Nuthatches
Order: PasseriformesFamily: Sittidae

Nuthatches are small woodland birds. They have the unusual ability to climb down trees head first, unlike other birds which can only go upwards. Nuthatches have big heads, short tails and powerful bills and feet.

 Eurasian nuthatch, Sitta europaea

Treecreepers
Order: PasseriformesFamily: Certhiidae

Treecreepers are small woodland birds, brown above and white below. They have thin pointed down-curved bills, which they use to extricate insects from bark. They have stiff tail feathers, like woodpeckers, which they use to support themselves on vertical trees.

 Eurasian treecreeper, Certhia familiaris
 Short-toed treecreeper, Certhia brachydactyla

Wrens
Order: PasseriformesFamily: Troglodytidae

The wrens are mainly small and inconspicuous except for their loud songs. These birds have short wings and thin down-turned bills. Several species often hold their tails upright. All are insectivorous.

 Eurasian wren, Troglodytes troglodytes

Dippers
Order: PasseriformesFamily: Cinclidae

Dippers are a group of perching birds whose habitat includes aquatic environments in the Americas, Europe and Asia. They are named for their bobbing or dipping movements.

 White-throated dipper, Cinclus cinclus

Starlings
Order: PasseriformesFamily: Sturnidae

Starlings are small to medium-sized passerine birds. Their flight is strong and direct and they are very gregarious. Their preferred habitat is fairly open country. They eat insects and fruit. Plumage is typically dark with a metallic sheen.

 European starling, Sturnus vulgaris
 Rosy starling, Pastor roseus (A)

Mockingbirds and thrashers
Order: PasseriformesFamily: Mimidae

The mimids are the New World family of passerine birds, Mimidae, that includes thrashers, mockingbirds, tremblers, and the New World catbirds.

 Gray catbird, Dumetella carolinensis (A)

Thrushes and allies
Order: PasseriformesFamily: Turdidae

The thrushes are a group of passerine birds that occur mainly in the Old World. They are plump, soft plumaged, small to medium-sized insectivores or sometimes omnivores, often feeding on the ground. Many have attractive songs.

 White's thrush, Zoothera aurea (A)
 Swainson's thrush, Catharus ustulatus (A)
 Siberian thrush, Geokichla sibirica (A)
 Mistle thrush, Turdus viscivorus
 Song thrush, Turdus philomelos
 Redwing, Turdus iliacus
 Eurasian blackbird, Turdus merula
 American robin, Turdus migratorius (A)
 Eyebrowed thrush, Turdus obscurus (A)
 Fieldfare, Turdus pilaris
 Ring ouzel, Turdus torquatus
 Black-throated thrush, Turdus atrogularis (A)
 Dusky thrush, Turdus eunomus (A)
 Naumann's thrush, Turdus naumanni (A)

Old World flycatchers
Order: PasseriformesFamily: Muscicapidae

Old World flycatchers are a large group of small passerine birds native to the Old World. They are mainly small arboreal insectivores. The appearance of these birds is highly varied, but they mostly have weak songs and harsh calls.

 Spotted flycatcher, Muscicapa striata
 European robin, Erithacus rubecula
 White-throated robin, Irania gutturalis (A)
 Siberian rubythroat, Calliope calliope (A)
 Thrush nightingale, Luscinia luscinia (A)
 Common nightingale, Luscinia megarhynchos
 Bluethroat, Luscinia svecica
 Siberian rubythroat, Calliope calliope (A)
 Red-flanked bluetail, Tarsiger cyanurus (A)
 Red-breasted flycatcher, Ficedula parva (A)
 European pied flycatcher, Ficedula hypoleuca
 Collared flycatcher, Ficedula albicollis (A)
 Common redstart, Phoenicurus phoenicurus
 Black redstart, Phoenicurus ochruros
 Rufous-tailed rock-thrush, Monticola saxatilis (A)
 Blue rock-thrush, Monticola solitarius (A)
 Whinchat, Saxicola rubetra
 European stonechat, Saxicola rubicola
 Siberian stonechat, Saxicola maurus (A)
 Northern wheatear, Oenanthe oenanthe
 Isabelline wheatear, Oenanthe isabellina (A)
 Desert wheatear, Oenanthe deserti (A)
 Pied wheatear, Oenanthe pleschanka (A)
 Western black-eared wheatear, Oenanthe hispanica (A)
 Eastern black-eared wheatear, Oenanthe melanoleuca (A)

Waxwings
Order: PasseriformesFamily: Bombycillidae

The waxwings are a group of passerine birds with soft silky plumage and unique red tips to some of the wing feathers. In the Bohemian and cedar waxwings, these tips look like sealing wax and give the group its name. These are arboreal birds of northern forests. They live on insects in summer and berries in winter.

 Bohemian waxwing, Bombycilla garrulus

Accentors
Order: PasseriformesFamily: Prunellidae

The accentors are in the only bird family, Prunellidae, which is completely endemic to the Palearctic. They are small, fairly drab species superficially similar to sparrows.

 Alpine accentor, Prunella collaris (A)
 Dunnock, Prunella modularis

Old World sparrows
'Order's: PasseriformesFamily: Passeridae

Old World sparrows are small passerine birds. In general, sparrows tend to be small, plump, brown or grey birds with short tails and short powerful beaks. Sparrows are seed eaters, but they also consume small insects.

 House sparrow, Passer domesticus
 Eurasian tree sparrow, Passer montanus
 Rock sparrow, Petronia petronia (A)

Wagtails and pipits
Order: PasseriformesFamily: Motacillidae

Motacillidae is a family of small passerine birds with medium to long tails. They include the wagtails, longclaws and pipits. They are slender, ground feeding insectivores of open country.

 Gray wagtail, Motacilla cinerea
 Western yellow wagtail, Motacilla flava
 Citrine wagtail, Motacilla citreola (A)
 White wagtail, Motacilla alba
 Richard's pipit, Anthus richardi (A)
 Blyth's pipit, Anthus godlewskii (A)
 Tawny pipit, Anthus campestris
 Meadow pipit, Anthus pratensis
 Tree pipit, Anthus trivialis
 Olive-backed pipit, Anthus hodgsoni (A)
 Red-throated pipit, Anthus cervinus
 Water pipit, Anthus spinoletta
 Rock pipit, Anthus petrosus (A)

Finches, euphonias, and allies
Order: PasseriformesFamily: Fringillidae

Finches are seed-eating passerine birds, that are small to moderately large and have a strong beak, usually conical and in some species very large. All have twelve tail feathers and nine primaries. These birds have a bouncing flight with alternating bouts of flapping and gliding on closed wings, and most sing well.

 Common chaffinch, Fringilla coelebs
 Brambling, Fringilla montifringilla
 Hawfinch, Coccothraustes coccothraustes
 Common rosefinch, Carpodacus erythrinus (A)
 Eurasian bullfinch, Pyrrhula pyrrhula
 European greenfinch, Chloris chloris
 Twite, Linaria flavirostris
 Eurasian linnet, Linaria cannabina
 Common redpoll, Acanthis flammea
 Lesser redpoll, Acanthis cabaret
 Hoary redpoll, Acanthis hornemanni (A)
 Parrot crossbill, Loxia pytyopsittacus (A)
 Red crossbill, Loxia curvirostra
 White-winged crossbill, Loxia leucoptera (A)
 European goldfinch, Carduelis carduelis
 Citril finch, Serinus citrinella (A)
 European serin, Serinus serinus
 Eurasian siskin, Spinus spinus

Longspurs and snow buntings
Order: PasseriformesFamily: Calcariidae

The Calcariidae are a family of birds that had been traditionally grouped with the New World sparrows, but differ in a number of respects and are usually found in open grassy areas.

 Lapland longspur, Calcarius lapponicus (A)
 Snow bunting, Plectrophenax nivalis

Old World buntings
Order: PasseriformesFamily: Emberizidae

Emberizidae is a family of seed-eating passerine birds with distinctively finch-like bills. In Europe, most species are called buntings. Many emberizid species have distinctive head patterns.

 Corn bunting, Emberiza calandra
 Rock bunting, Emberiza cia (A)
 Cirl bunting, Emberiza cirlus (A)
 Yellowhammer, Emberiza citrinella
 Pine bunting, Emberiza leucocephalos (A)
 Ortolan bunting, Emberiza hortulana
 Reed bunting, Emberiza schoeniclus
 Yellow-breasted bunting, Emberiza aureola (A)
 Little bunting, Emberiza pusilla (A)
 Rustic bunting, Emberiza rustica (A)
 Yellow-browed bunting, Emberiza chrysophrys (A)

New World sparrows
Order: PasseriformesFamily: Passerellidae

Until 2017, these species were considered part of the family Emberizidae. Most of the species are known as sparrows, but these birds are not closely related to the Old World sparrows which are in the family Passeridae. Many of these have distinctive head patterns.

 Dark-eyed junco, Junco hyemalis (A)
 White-throated sparrow, Zonotrichia albicollis (A)
 Song sparrow, Melospiza melodia (A)

See also
 List of birds
 Lists of birds by region

References

 

 

Lists of birds by country
Lists of birds of Europe
Fauna of Belgium
Birds